Malpighiodes is a genus in the Malpighiaceae, a family of about 75 genera of flowering plants in the order Malpighiales. Malpighiodes comprises 4 species of woody vines native to northern South America. They are found in northern Brazil, French Guiana, Guyana, Suriname and Venezuela.

The genus name of Malpighiodes is in honour of Marcello Malpighi, a 17th-century Italian physician and botanist. The genus was circumscribed by Franz Josef Niedenzu Franz Josef Niedenzu in Arbeiten Bot. Inst. Königl. Lyceums
Hosianum Braunsberg vol.3 on page 18 in 1908.

Species
As accepted by Plants of the World Online;
Malpighiodes bracteosa(Griseb.) W. R. Anderson
Malpighiodes guianensis(W. R. Anderson) W. R. Anderson
Malpighiodes leucanthele(Griseb.) W. R. Anderson
Malpighiodes liesneri(W. R. Anderson) W. R. Anderson

References

Other sources
Anderson, W. R. 2006. Eight segregates from the neotropical genus Mascagnia (Malpighiaceae). Novon 16: 168–204.

External links
Malpighiaceae Malpighiaceae - description, taxonomy, phylogeny, and nomenclature
Malpighiodes

Malpighiaceae
Malpighiaceae genera
Flora of northern South America
Flora of North Brazil